Ralf Jürgen Spatzier is a mathematician specialising in differential geometry, dynamical systems, and ergodic theory.

Spatzier received his Ph.D. in Mathematics from the University of Warwick in 1983 under the joint supervision of Caroline Series and Anatole Katok and joined Stony Brook University as an assistant professor. In 1990 he moved to the University of Michigan where he is now a full professor. He is a fellow of the American Mathematical Society.

References

Fellows of the American Mathematical Society
Living people
University of Michigan faculty
20th-century American mathematicians
21st-century American mathematicians
Differential geometers
Year of birth missing (living people)